Antimargarita maoria is a species of sea snail, a marine gastropod mollusk in the family Margaritidae.

Description
The height of the shell attains 12 mm, its diameter 14 mm.

Distribution
This marine species is endemic to the Antipodes Islands, New Zealand.

References

 Dell, R. 1995: New species and records of deep-water Mollusca from off New Zealand. Tuhinga:  Records of the Museum of New Zealand Te Papa Tongarewa 2: 1-26

External links
 To World Register of Marine Species
 New Zealand Mollusca: Antimargarita maoria

maoria
Gastropods described in 1995